Neptunicoccus  is a Gram-negative and aerobic genus of bacteria from the family of Rhodobacteraceae with one known species (Neptunicoccus sediminis). Neptunicoccus sediminis has been isolated from sediments from the Yellow Sea.

References

Rhodobacteraceae
Bacteria genera
Monotypic bacteria genera